Hylaeus annulatus, is a species of hymenopteran in the family Colletidae. It is found in North America and Europe.

References

Further reading

External links

 

Colletidae
Articles created by Qbugbot
Insects described in 1758
Taxa named by Carl Linnaeus